Bernard Boissier (born 3 October 1952, in Nîmes (Gard, France) is a former French international footballer.

A defender, Boissier played successively for Nîmes Olympique (from 1964 to 1981), Lyon (1981–1982), Toulon (from 1982 to 1986) and Le Grau-du-Roi (from 1986 to 1988).

On 26 April 1975, he got his first and last cap with the France national team against Portugal in a 0–2 defeat but played only for two minutes.

References

External links
 
 

1952 births
Living people
French footballers
France international footballers
Nîmes Olympique players
Olympique Lyonnais players
SC Toulon players
Footballers from Nîmes
French football managers
Nîmes Olympique managers
Association football defenders